Trichoblaniulidae is a family of millipedes belonging to the order Julida.

Genera:
 Cryptoporobates Brölemann, 1921
 Trichoblaniulus Verhoeff, 1898

References

Julida